Degagah (also Romanized as Degāgāh and Dagāgāh; also known as Degāgā, Deh Āqā, Deh Gāgeh, Deh-i-Āgha, and Deh-i-Gāgeh) is a village in Chehel Cheshmeh-ye Gharbi Rural District, Sarshiv District, Saqqez County, Kurdistan Province, Iran. At the 2006 census, its population was 366, in 61 families. The village is populated by Kurds.

References 

Towns and villages in Saqqez County
Kurdish settlements in Kurdistan Province